Richard James Biggs II (March 18, 1960 – May 22, 2004) was an American television and stage actor, known for his roles on the television series Days of Our Lives and Babylon 5.

Early life 
Born in Columbus, Ohio, Biggs attended the  University of Southern California on scholarship, studying theatre. He briefly taught at a Los Angeles high school before landing his first major television role, that of Dr. Marcus Hunter on the soap opera Days of Our Lives.

Biggs was diagnosed with hearing problems when he was 13, and was partially deaf in one ear, completely deaf in the other. He frequently used his celebrity status to raise money for the Aliso Academy, a private school in Rancho Santa Margarita, California that serves deaf children.

Career 
From 1987 until 1994, Biggs played the role of Dr. Marcus Hunter on the soap opera Days of Our Lives.

He appeared as Dr. Stephen Franklin on the well-regarded science fiction series Babylon 5 (1994–1998), reprising the role in the final aired episode of the spin-off show, Crusade ("Each Night I Dream of Home").

After Babylon 5, he played roles on Any Day Now and Strong Medicine, as well as the recurring role of Clayton Boudreaux on the soap opera Guiding Light.

Biggs' stage credits include The Tempest, Cymbeline and The Taming of the Shrew.

At the time of his death, he was a regular on the television series Strong Medicine; following his death, his character was killed in an off-screen traffic accident. He also guest starred as a visiting scientist on Tremors: The Series. Biggs' final film appearance was in We Interrupt This Program, a short film also featuring Biggs' Babylon 5 costar, Bruce Boxleitner, released as a companion piece to the 2004 remake of Dawn of the Dead on DVD.  His final television appearance was as a guest star on a 2004 episode of the Nickelodeon series Drake & Josh, entitled "The Gary Grill" portraying an FBI agent, which was dedicated to his memory. He only won one award in his career. That award was the Soap Opera Digest Award for Supporting Actor.

Personal life 
He married Lori Gebers on August 1, 1998. They had two children, Richard James III and Hunter Lee.

Death 
Biggs collapsed at his home in Los Angeles, and died at Providence Saint Joseph Medical Center of complications stemming from aortic dissection on May 22, 2004. He was 44 years old.

Filmography

Film

Television

References

External links

 
 Death Announcement by J. Michael Straczynski, creator of Babylon 5
 Richard Biggs Memorial Video by John E. Hudgens
 

1960 births
2004 deaths
African-American male actors
American male soap opera actors
Deaths from aortic dissection
Male actors from Columbus, Ohio
USC School of Dramatic Arts alumni
American male deaf actors
American male television actors
20th-century American male actors
20th-century African-American people
21st-century African-American people
21st-century American male actors